The Bangladesh National Film Award for Best Performance in a Negative Role is an award presented annually at the National Film Awards, considered the most prestigious film awards in Bangladesh. The award was introduced in 2001, with Shahidul Alam Sachchu winning the first award.

List of winners
Key

Multiple wins
The following individuals received two or more Best Actor in a Negative Role awards:

See also
 Bangladesh National Film Award for Best Performance in a Comic Role
 Bangladesh National Film Award for Best Actor
 Bangladesh National Film Award for Best Actress
 Bangladesh National Film Award for Best Supporting Actor
 Bangladesh National Film Award for Best Supporting Actress

Notes

References

Sources

 
 
 
 
 
 
 

Negative Role
Film awards for Best Cast